George Grant Ward (4 July 1889 – 18 February 1928) was an Australian rules footballer who played with Richmond in the Victorian Football League (VFL).

Death
He died on 18 February 1928.

Notes

References
 Hogan P: The Tigers Of Old, Richmond FC, (Melbourne), 1996. 
 A Brutal Attack: Unprovoked Assault on Railway Platform: Court Awards Damages, The Age, (Friday, 3 February 1928), p.7.

External links 

 Profile at Tigerland Archive

1889 births
1928 deaths
Australian rules footballers from Tasmania
Richmond Football Club players
City-South Football Club players
People from Hawthorn, Victoria
Australian rules footballers from Melbourne